Education in Somaliland is provided in public and private schools. Education is Somaliland is managed by Ministry of Education and Science which controls the development and administration of state schools, it's also has an advisory and supervisory role in private schools.

Ministry of Education and Science

The Ministry of Education and Science of Somaliland is a national body implementing the executive functions relating to the development of state policy and to legal regulation in the following spheres: basic education, secondary/vocational education, non-formal education, special needs education and higher education in both public and private institutions.
The Ministry of Education and Science of Somaliland is a national executive authority responsible for the state policy development and normative and legal regulation in the sphere of education, research, scientific, technological and innovation activities, nanotechnology, intellectual property, as well as in the sphere of nurturing, social support and social protection of students and pupils of educational institutions.
The work of the Ministry of Education and Science of Somaliland is governed by the Constitution of the Republic of Somaliland, National Education Act, National Constitutional Laws, and Decrees by the President of the Republic of Somaliland.
The Ministry of Education and Science of the Republic of Somaliland worked in cooperation with other national executive bodies, executive bodies of the subjects of the Republic of Somaliland, local authorities, public associations and other institutions.

Somaliland Education System
The Somaliland education system has four main levels: pre-primary, primary/alternative, secondary/vocational and higher education. 

Pre-primary (early childhood) is now integrated into formal education and in private Quranic School systems, running for up to two to three years.

Primary schooling lasts for eight years and is divided into a four year-elementary or lower primary cycle and a four-year intermediate or upper primary cycle. 

Secondary education and Vocational Training (as per design) also run for four years. The exception is the Arabic medium schools, which have 9 years of primary/intermediate schooling and 3 years of secondary education.

The tertiary level for both systems has a minimum of two years with many running for four.

See also

 Ministry of Education and Science (Somaliland)
 Ahmed Mohamed Diriye
 List of universities in Somaliland
 List of schools in Somaliland
 National Library of Somaliland

References